Ron Weaver may refer to:

 Ron Weaver (American football), who was unable to make it onto a professional team after college so he played for the University of Texas under a fake identity
 Ron Weaver (TV producer), a television producer
 Ron Weaver (mayor), one of the former mayors of Tallahassee, Florida